The Hinckley's Corner Historic District, also known as Paine Hollow, is a historic district including three properties located at 0, 25, and 40 Way #112 in Wellfleet, Massachusetts.  This small cluster of properties are a representative of the outer Cape's life in the 19th century.  All three houses are fairly utilitarian 1-1/2 story Cape style houses, with only modest traces of late Georgian or Federal styling.  The oldest house, the Jonathan Young House at 40 Way #112, was built c. 1790-91, and was owned for a significant portion of the 19th century by members of the Hinckley family.  This property includes a 19th-century barn, a c. 1920 structure whose uses have included a retail store and an art studio, and a c. 1950 garage.  The John Lewis House at 25 Way #112 was built c. 1820, and has a Federal style fanlight over the main entrance.  Its property includes a garage/guesthouse built c. 1924, originally to house a Model T firetruck, and an oysterhouse built 1827-28.

The third house is the Robert Paine House at 0 Way #112; it was also built c. 1820, and is the most-altered of the three, with additions on either end.  It stands on a larger property (neary 5 acres, compared to the 1-2 acre lots on which the others stand), and includes a small shed built c. 1820 and a boatbuilding shop built c. 1915.  This house is further notable for housing a worker who helped build the Wellfleet Marconi Station in the early 1900s.

The district was listed on the National Register of Historic Places in 1998.

See also
National Register of Historic Places listings in Barnstable County, Massachusetts

References

Historic districts on the National Register of Historic Places in Massachusetts
Wellfleet, Massachusetts
National Register of Historic Places in Barnstable County, Massachusetts